Euphorbia parvicyathophora is a species of plant in the family Euphorbiaceae. It is endemic to South-West Madagascar. The Euphorbia parvicyathophora typically lives in an environment that is of rocky material; particularly, limestone is its primary locale of habitation. Euphorbia parvicyathophora grows within the soil pockets of cavernous limestone along the southern bank of the Fiherenana river, a river in the southern part of Madagascar, which flows to the Indian Ocean. Euphorbia parvicyathophora is threatened by habitat loss.

References

Endemic flora of Madagascar
parvicyathophora
Critically endangered plants
Taxonomy articles created by Polbot